The Elusive Light and Sound Vol. 1 is a 2002 compilation album by Steve Vai. The album collects many of the songs that Vai recorded for movies and television shows.

The album is Volume 1 in "The Secret Jewel Box".

Track listing

1. "Celluloid Heroes" (Ray Davies) - (The Kinks' Cover)

Recorded for "Interview with the Vampire" (1994) (does not appear in the film)
2. "Love Blood"

From or inspired by the movie "Crossroads" (1986), with Ralph Macchio and Joe Seneca
 These tracks were not released as part of the OST
3. "Fried Chicken" (does not appear in the film)
4. "Butler's Bag" (Vai, Ry Cooder) (different version from the film)
5. "Head-Cuttin' Duel" (Vai, Cooder)
6. "Eugene's Trick Bag" (Vai)

From or inspired by the movie "Dudes" (1987)
7. "Amazing Grace" (Previously Released on the soundtrack album)
8. "Louisiana Swamp Swank"

From or inspired the movie Bill & Ted's Bogus Journey (1991)
9. "Air Guitar Hell"
10. "The Reaper" (Previously Released on the soundtrack album)
11. "Introducing the Wylde Stallions"
12. "Girls Mature Faster Than Guys"
13. "The Battle"
14. "Meet the Reaper"
15. "Final Guitar Solo"
16. "The Reaper Rap" (Previously Released on the soundtrack album)

From the movie Encino Man (1992)
17. "Drive the Hell Out of Here" 
18. "Get the Hell Out of Here" (Previously Released on the soundtrack album)

From the movie PCU (1994)
 From the film Score, not released on the original motion picture soundtrack album (except n.40)
19 "Welcome Pre-Frosh"
20 "The Dark Hallway"
21 "The Dead Band Ends"
22 "The Cause Heads"
23 "Find the Meat"
24 "The Ax Will Fall"
25 "Now We Run (Cue)"
26 "Hey Jack"
27 "What!"
28 "Still Running"
29 "Dead Heads"
30 "Blow Me Where the Pampers Is"
31 "Pins and Needles"
32 "Plug My Ass In"
33 "Loose Keg Sightings"
34 "Don't Sweat it"
35 "How Hidge"
36 "Beer Beer"
37 "We're Not Gonna Protest"
38 "Initiation"
39 "See Ya Next Year"
40 "Now We Run" (Previously Released on the soundtrack album)

Except where noted, all other tracks are unreleased on any other album.
All songs written by Steve Vai, except where noted.

Steve Vai albums
2002 compilation albums
Favored Nations albums
Instrumental rock compilation albums
Soundtrack compilation albums
Favored Nations compilation albums